was a Japanese alpinist. His achievements include the winter solo ascent of the "Great North Faces of the Alps" or "North Face Trilogy" (Matterhorn in 1977, second winter solo ascent ever; Eiger in 1978, first winter solo ascent ever; Grandes Jorasses in 1979, also first winter solo ascent ever) and the world's first winter solo ascent of the South Face of Aconcagua in 1981. He died in 1991 in an avalanche while ascending the Ultar II South east face.

Notable achievements
1977 World second winter solo ascent to Matterhorn North face
1978 World first winter solo ascent to Eiger North face
1979 Winter solo ascent to Grandes Jorasses North face
1980 Winter solo ascent to Aconcagua North face Normal Route
1981 World first winter solo ascent to Aconcagua South face France Route

Bibliography
"北壁に舞う：生きぬくことが冒険だ"(1979) Shueisha Publishing(集英社)   
"岩壁よおはよう"(1981) Chuo Koron Publishing (中央公論社)  
"北壁からのメッセージ"(1984) Minshusha Publishing(民衆社)  
"我が青春の挑戦"(1984) Seikyo Shimbun Publishing(聖教新聞社) co-authored with Ken'ichi Horie
"山に向かいて"(1987) Benesse Corporation Publishing (ベネッセコーポレーション福武書店)   
"生きぬくことは冒険だよ"(1992) Shueisha Publishing(集英社)  edited by Masami Hasegawa and Toyoji Oda

Further reading
Fujiki, Takane (1974)"ああ南壁：第二次RCCエベレスト登攀記" Asahi Shimbun publishing.   
Sase, Minoru (1994)"長谷川恒男虚空の登攀者" Yama To Keikoku Publishing(山と溪谷社).

References

External links
Dakota Jones runs memorial race of Tsuneo Hasegawa
Goldwin History and Tsuneo Hasegawa
Hasetsune Cup, An Endurance Race to Commemorate Alpinist Tsuneo Hasegawa

People from Kanagawa Prefecture
Japanese mountain climbers
Japanese explorers
Mountaineering deaths
1947 births
1991 deaths